Ferenc Vozar (19 April 1945 in Budapest - 15 February 1999 in Denzlingen) was a Hungarian-born ice hockey player who played for the West German national team. He won a bronze medal at the 1976 Winter Olympics.

References

External links
 
 
 
 

1945 births
1999 deaths
Sportspeople from Budapest
Hungarian emigrants to West Germany
Ice hockey players at the 1976 Winter Olympics
Olympic bronze medalists for West Germany
Olympic ice hockey players of West Germany
Olympic medalists in ice hockey
West German ice hockey forwards
Medalists at the 1976 Winter Olympics
EHC Freiburg players
Recipients of the Silver Laurel Leaf
Hungarian ice hockey forwards